Kiyohiro (written: 清寛, 清宏 or 輝良寛) is a masculine Japanese given name. Notable people with the name include:

, Japanese politician
, Japanese footballer
, Japanese writer
, Japanese artist

Japanese masculine given names